Mission San Luis Rey de Francia is a former Spanish mission in San Luis Rey, a neighborhood of Oceanside, California. This Mission lent its name to the Luiseño tribe of Mission Indians.

At its prime, Mission San Luis Rey's structures and services compound covered almost , making it the largest of the Californian missions, along with its surrounding agricultural land. Multiple outposts were built in support of Mission San Luis Rey and placed under its supervision, including San Antonio de Pala Asistencia in 1816 and Las Flores Estancia in 1823.

Spanish era

The full name of the mission is La Misión de San Luis, Rey de Francia (The Mission of Saint Louis, King of France).  It was named for King Louis IX of France.  Its nickname is "King of the Missions". It was founded by padre Fermín Lasuén on June 12, 1798, the eighteenth of the twenty-one Spanish missions built in the Alta California Province of the Viceroyalty of New Spain.

The current church, built in 1815, is the third church on this location.  It is a National Historic Landmark, for its pristine example of a Spanish mission church complex. Today the mission complex functions as a parish church of the Diocese of San Diego as well as a museum and retreat center. Mission San Luis Rey De Francia raised about 26,000 cattle as well as goats, geese, and pigs.

An early account of life at the Mission was written by one of its Native American converts, Luiseño Pablo Tac, in his work Indian Life and Customs at Mission San Luis Rey: A Record of California Mission Life by Pablo Tac, An Indian Neophyte (written c.1835 in Rome, later edited and translated in 1958 by Minna Hewes and Gordon Hewes). In his book, Tac lamented the rapid population decline of his Luiseño people after the founding of the mission:
In Quechla not long ago there were 5,000 souls, with all their neighboring lands. Through a sickness that came to California, 2,000 souls died, and 3,000 were left.

The Mission-born, Franciscan-educated Tac wrote that his people initially attempted to bar the Spaniards from invading their Southern California lands. Pablo Tac went on to describe the preferential conditions and treatment the padres received:
In the mission of San Luis Rey de Francia the Fernandino  father is like a king. He has his pages, alcaldes, majordomos, musicians, soldiers, gardens, ranchos, livestock....

Mexican era

The first Peruvian Pepper Tree (Schinus molle) in California was planted here in 1830, now iconic, widely planted, and renamed the California Pepper tree in the state. After the Mexican secularization act of 1833 much of Mission San Luis Rey de Francia land was sold off. Indigenous peoples, previously forced to work on missions, were freed from direct subjugation in the mission system through this act. When Native people at San Luis Rey learned of their impending freedom, they proclaimed together: "We are free! We do not want to obey! We do not want to work!" and left the mission by the thousands, returning to their rural communities "which in some cases their forebears had left two generations earlier."

During the Mexican–American War in Alta California (1846–1847), the Mission was utilized as a military outpost by the United States Army. In July 1847, U.S. military governor of California Richard Barnes Mason created an Indian sub-agency at Mission San Luis Rey, and his men took charge of the mission property in August, appointing Jesse Hunter from the recently arrived Mormon Battalion as sub-agent. Battalion guide Jean Baptiste Charbonneau, the Native American Shoshone child of Sacagawea who had traveled with the Lewis and Clark Expedition forty years earlier, was appointed by Mason as the Alcalde "within the District of San Diego, at or near San Luis Rey" in November 1847.  Charbonneau resigned from the post in August, 1848, claiming that "because of his Indian heritage others thought him biased when problems arose between the Indians and the other inhabitants of the district."

American era

With secularization of the mission in 1834, no religious services were held and the Luiseño were left behind by the fleeing Franciscan padres. The Mission's religious services restarted in 1893, when two Mexican priests were given permission to restore the Mission as a Franciscan college. Father Joseph O'Keefe was assigned as an interpreter for the monks. It was he who began to restore the old Mission in 1895. The cuadrángulo (quadrangle) and church were completed in 1905. San Luis Rey College was opened as a seminary in 1950, but closed in 1969.

Episodes 2, 3, 4 and 12 of the Disney-produced Zorro TV series include scenes filmed in 1957 at San Luis Rey, which doubled for the Mission of San Gabriel; Disney added a skull and crossbones to the cemetery entrance.

In 1998, Sir Gilbert Levine led members of the Los Angeles Philharmonic and, with the special permission of Pope John Paul II, the ancient Cappella Giulia Choir of St. Peter's Basilica, in a series of concerts to commemorate the 200th anniversary of the founding of the mission. These festival concerts constituted the first-ever visit of this 500-year-old choir to the Western Hemisphere. The concerts were broadcast on NPR's Performance Today. In February 2013, the seismic retrofitting was completed.

Today, Mission San Luis Rey de Francia is a working mission, cared for by the people who belong to the parish, with ongoing restoration projects. Mission San Luis Rey has a Museum, Visitors' Center, Retreat Center, gardens with the historic Pepper Tree, and the original small cemetery.

See also

 Spanish missions in California
 List of Spanish missions in California
 Las Flores Asistencia
 Mission San Antonio de Pala
 Luiseño – Mission Indians
 Population of Native California
 California mission clash of cultures
 USNS Mission San Luis Rey (AO-128) – a Buenaventura Class fleet oiler launched during World War II.

Notes

References

External links

 Official Mission San Luis Rey website
 Official Mission San Luis Rey parish website
 Open Access teaching unit on Pablo Tac's account of the conversion of the Saluiseños, in English and Spanish versions
 Calisphere – California Digital Library: Early photographs, sketches, and land surveys of Mission San Luis Rey de Francia.
 Elevation & Site Layout sketches of the Mission compound
 Satellite image from Google Maps
 Early History of the California Coast, a National Park Service Discover Our Shared Heritage Travel Itinerary
 Mission San Luis Rey – Pictures, videos and history
 
 Mission San Luis Rey Cemetery at Find a Grave

San Luis Rey de Francia
1798 in Alta California
Churches in San Diego County, California
Museums in San Diego County, California
Religious museums in California
1798 establishments in Alta California
California Mission Indians
History of San Diego County, California
Roman Catholic churches completed in 1811
California Historical Landmarks
National Historic Landmarks in California
Native American history of California
Churches on the National Register of Historic Places in California
National Register of Historic Places in San Diego County, California
Oceanside, California
19th-century Roman Catholic church buildings in the United States